Asian U23 Volleyball Championship may refer to:
 Asian Men's U23 Volleyball Championship, the official competition for under 23 men's national volleyball teams of Asia and Oceania, organized by the Asian Volleyball Confederation (AVC)
 Asian Women's U23 Volleyball Championship, the official competition for under 23 women's national volleyball teams of Asia and Oceania, organized by the Asian Volleyball Confederation (AVC)